Vladimir Miletić (born 5 March 2003) is a Serbian professional footballer who plays as a defensive midfielder for Vojvodina.

Career statistics

Club

References

External links
 
 

Living people
2003 births
Serbian footballers
Association football midfielders 
FK Vojvodina players
Serbian SuperLiga players
Serbia youth international footballers
Serbia under-21 international footballers